Glen Head is a hamlet and census-designated place (CDP) located within the Town of Oyster Bay in Nassau County, on the North Shore of Long Island, in New York, United States. It is considered part of the greater Glen Cove area, which is anchored by the City of Glen Cove. The population was 4,837 at the 2020 census.

Glen Head residents attend the award winning North Shore Central School District.

The Strat-O-Matic game company is headquartered in Glen Head.

Geography

Glen Head has transportation connections via its bus line (N27) and its rail line Long Island Rail Road to New York City and three major roads: Glen Cove Road, Glen Head Road, and Glen Cove Avenue.

Demographics

2010 census
As of the 2010 census the population of the Census designated place was 4,697. The population was 91.8% White 86.2% Non-Hispanic white, 0.9% Black or African American, 0.1% Native American, 3.4% Asian, 0.0% Pacific Islander, 2.3% from other races, and 1.5% from two or more races. Hispanic or Latino of any race were 8.1% of the population.

2000 census
As of the census of 2000, there were 4,625 people, 1,681 households, and 1,314 families residing in the CDP. The population density was 2,870.7 per square mile (1,109.1/km2). There were 1,717 housing units at an average density of 1,065.7/sq mi (411.8/km2). The racial makeup of the CDP was 95.29% White, 0.50% African American, 0.04% Native American, 2.01% Asian, 0.06% Pacific Islander, 1.15% from other races, and 0.95% from two or more races. Hispanic or Latino of any race were 4.61% of the population.

There were 1,681 households, out of which 34.0% had children under the age of 18 living with them, 65.0% were married couples living together, 9.8% had a female householder with no husband present, and 21.8% were non-families. 18.0% of all households were made up of individuals, and 9.0% had someone living alone who was 65 years of age or older. The average household size was 2.75 and the average family size was 3.12.

In the CDP, the population was spread out, with 23.9% under the age of 18, 5.3% from 18 to 24, 26.9% from 25 to 44, 27.1% from 45 to 64, and 16.9% who were 65 years of age or older. The median age was 42 years. For every 100 females, there were 81.1 males. For every 100 females age 18 and over, there were 79.3 males.

The median income for a household in the CDP was $94,453, and the median income for a family was $103,048. Males had a median income of $86,469 versus $50,909 for females. The per capita income for the CDP was $67,425. About 1.4% of families and 2.4% of the population were below the poverty line, including 2.2% of those under age 18 and 1.4% of those age 65 or over.

References

External links 

 Glen Cove Chamber of Commerce official website
 Glenwood–Glen Head Civic Association official website
 Promenade Civic Association official website

Oyster Bay (town), New York
Census-designated places in New York (state)
Hamlets in New York (state)
Census-designated places in Nassau County, New York
Hamlets in Nassau County, New York